Dhooram Adhighamillai is a 1983 Indian Tamil-language film directed by  Robert–Rajasekar, starring Karthik, Viji and Janagaraj.

Plot 
Meena, the lead actress in Manikam's drama troupe, creates trouble for him as her love life is affecting his business. Meena's lover and Manikam keep trying to outwit each for their personal gains.

Cast 
Karthik as Araamuthu
Viji as Meena
Janagaraj
Samikannu
G. Seenivasan
Kumarimuthu
Junior T. S. Balaiah
Sathya
Noorjahan
Seethapatti
R. Parthiepan

References

External links 

 

1983 films
1980s Tamil-language films
Films scored by Shankar–Ganesh